Chad Blount (born September 4, 1979) is an American former stock car racing driver. He raced in all three of NASCAR's major series, with his last appearance coming in 2010.

NASCAR career

Nextel Cup Series
Blount made his debut in the then-Nextel Cup Series during the 2004 season. Driving the No. 37 R&J Racing Dodge, he attempted two races and was able to make the Tropicana 400, but finished 43rd after a mechanical failure. He also made one start in the No. 06 Mobil 1 Dodge for Penske-Jasper Racing at Talladega, however he finished 41st after an engine failure. Blount returned to the series in 2006 with plans to run the full season in the No. 37. After failing to qualify for the Daytona 500, he was released from the team. Beginning with the Golden Corral 500, he was hired by Front Row Motorsports to drive the No. 92 Dodge, which had previously been driven by Randy LaJoie. In 14 races between the team's No. 34, No. 61 and No. 92 cars, Blount was only able to qualify for two, finishing 42nd at both Martinsville Speedway and Richmond International Raceway.

Nationwide Series

Blount began his Busch Series career with Braun Racing in 2003. He would drive the No. 19 APP Prepaid Gas Cards Dodge through the first 11 races, however sponsorship issues forced him to leave the car. During those 11 races for Braun Racing he would post a best finish of 5th at Texas and had a top ten finish at Nashville. He would return to the series five races later with Welliver-Jesel Motorsports. He would drove the No. 66 Miller High Life Dodge in a total of eight races with a best finish of 15th at Michigan. Blount would then drive one race during the 2004 season for Hirschfeld Motorsports, which was a joint venture with Braun Racing. The No. 78 idialdirect.com Dodge finished in 34th place after an accident. In 2005, Blount would attempt three races, one with Braun Racing and two with ML Motorsports. He made the Meijer 300 at Kentucky in the No. 32 Winfuel Chevrolet and would finish that race in the 22nd position. His other two attempts with the No. 70 Foretravel Motorhomes Chevrolet were unable to get him in the field for race day. In 2009, he started and parked for Braun Racing in the No. 10 part-time and in the No. 87 NEMCO Motorsports Chevrolet for one race. Blount returned to the No. 10 again in the 2010 Sam's Town 300 at Las Vegas.

Craftsman Truck Series
Blount has one career Craftsman Truck Series start, which came in 2004 in the No. 2 Team ASE/Carquest Dodge for Ultra Motorsports. After starting 9th, he would finish 25th due to a crash.

ARCA career
Blount has won 8 ARCA races in his racing career. His best season came in 2002 in the No. 77 Dodge for Braun Racing. He finished 2nd in points with four wins, fourteen top 10s, and five poles. His most recent appearance in the series came in 2008 at Nashville Superspeedway in the No. 30 Dodge for Jones Group Racing.

Motorsports career results

NASCAR
(key) (Bold – Pole position awarded by qualifying time. Italics – Pole position earned by points standings or practice time. * – Most laps led.)

Nextel Cup Series

Daytona 500

Nationwide Series

Craftsman Truck Series

ARCA Re/Max Series
(key) (Bold – Pole position awarded by qualifying time. Italics – Pole position earned by points standings or practice time. * – Most laps led.)

References

External links
 
 Blount's NASCAR Profile

1979 births
NASCAR drivers
ARCA Menards Series drivers
American Speed Association drivers
Living people
People from St. Joseph County, Indiana
Racing drivers from Indiana
Team Penske drivers